Stanisław Kania (8 March 1927 – 3 March 2020) was a Polish communist politician.

Life and career
Kania joined the Polish Workers' Party in April 1945 when the Germans were driven out by the Red Army and Polish Communists began to take control of the country. 
He partook in campaigns organised by the party, such as the Volunteer Reserve of the Citizens' Militia and the national referendum in 1946. He became deputy representative of the constituency for Jasielski. In February 1947 he was elected chairman of the ZWM board in Jaslo. Then in December he  was appointed head of the Rural Youth Department in Rzeszow. In 1948, at the age of 21 he was elected as delegate to the unification congress of the Polish United Workers Party.
After Edward Gierek was forced to resign as General Secretary amidst much social and economic unrest, Kania was elected his successor on 6 September 1980. He admitted that the party had made many economic mistakes, and advocated working with Catholic and trade unionist opposition groups. He met with Solidarity Union leader Lech Wałęsa, and other critics of the party.

After a KGB bug caught Kania criticizing the Kremlin, the Soviets forced him to step down in 1981. He was succeeded by Prime Minister Gen. Wojciech Jaruzelski. In 2012, he was trialed for his role in the martial law crackdown in 1981, but acquitted.

Kania died on 3 March 2020 of pneumonia and heart failure, five days before his 93rd birthday.

References

 Stanisław Kania in Encyklopedia WIEM

1927 births
2020 deaths
People from Jasło County
People from Kraków Voivodeship (1919–1939)
Polish Workers' Party politicians
Members of the Politburo of the Polish United Workers' Party
Members of the Polish Sejm 1972–1976
Members of the Polish Sejm 1976–1980
Members of the Polish Sejm 1980–1985
Recipients of the Order of the Builders of People's Poland
Recipients of the Order of the Banner of Work
Deaths from pneumonia in Poland